The Sessions is a 2020 Nigerian romantic drama film written and directed by Judith Audu and produced by Audu, Omowumi Dada, Uyoyou Adia and Morten Foght.

The film was shot in the street of Lagos. It stars notable Nollywood actors and actresses such as Audu, Efa Iwara, Omowunmi Dada, Okey Uzoeshi, Tunbosun Aiyedehin, Fred Amata, Ada Ameh and Tony Akposheri.

Synopsis 
The film is a story of a couple who began their marriage on a smooth ground until their past came to hunt them. The various methods used to sustain the marriage created suspense through out the movie.

Cast 
Tunbosun Aiyedehin
Tony Akposeri
Fred Amata
Ada Ameh
Judith Audu
Omowunmi Dada
Efa Iwara 
Okey Uzoeshi

Awards and nominations 
The Sessions was nominated for 11 awards at the 2020 the 2020 edition of the Best of Nollywood Awards. The categories are; Movie of the Year, Best Director which goes to Judith Audu. The Best Leading Actor goes to Efa Iwara, Omowunmi Dada bagged Best Leading Actress. It also accrued Movie with Best Social Message, Best Screenplay, Best Editing, Best Use of Makeup, Best Soundtrack, Best use of Nigerian Food, and Best Kiss in a Movie.

References 

2020 romantic drama films
2020s English-language films
English-language Nigerian films
Films shot in Lagos
Nigerian romantic drama films